Ski Dairy is a British dairy and yogurt brand owned by Nestle.

History 
The company was founded by Express Dairies in Haywards Heath in 1963 and was the first yogurt to contain fruit pieces. They were bought out by Fonterra and Nestle in 2002 was popular around Europe and Australia (until 2006).

They celebrated their 50th anniversary in 2013.

Recall 
In 2020 the FSA recalled Ski yogurts for claims that it contained pieces of rubber. It is unknown if this was resolved. Nestle UK says it was due to a manufacturing error.

References

External links 
 Official Website

British brands
Yogurt companies
Australian brands
Companies of the United Kingdom
Companies established in 1963